Junior Leonardo Moreno Borrero (born 20 July 1993), is a Venezuelan professional footballer who plays for Major League Soccer club FC Cincinnati and the Venezuela national team as a midfielder.

Professional career

Zulia FC
In June 2015, Moreno moved to Zulia FC from ACD Lara after a couple successful seasons  Moreno won the 2016 Copa Venezuela with Zulia. He was team captain for Zulia during his last season.

D.C. United
On 2 January 2018, Moreno signed with MLS side D.C. United. Moreno debuted for United on 3 March 2018, in a 1–1 tie against Orlando City. Moreno played 20 games and contributed 2 assists for United in 2018. Statistically, Moreno is considered one of the best defensive midfielders in MLS. Moreno finished his 2019 season with 29 appearances, which he started in all of them, and provided 3 assists.

Moreno scored his first MLS goal in the 85th minute of the 3–1 win over Minnesota United on 29 September 2021.

FC Cincinnati 
On 25 February 2022, FC Cincinnati signed Moreno for the 2022 MLS season with an option for 2023.

International career 
Moreno was born in Venezuela, and is of Argentine descent. Moreno made his debut for the Venezuela national football team in a friendly 1–1 draw with the United States, wherein he assisted Venezuela's goal. Moreno played in the 2019 Copa América for Venezuela.

Career statistics

Club

International

International goals
Scores and results list Peru's goal tally first.

Personal life
Moreno's father, Carlos Horacio Moreno, is an Argentine former footballer and coach, and his brothers Carlos Moreno and Marcelo Moreno are also footballers. In January 2020, Moreno received his green card.

References

External links

Zulia FC Profile

1993 births
Living people
People from San Cristóbal, Táchira
Venezuelan expatriate sportspeople in the United States
Venezuelan footballers
Venezuela international footballers
Venezuelan people of Argentine descent
Asociación Civil Deportivo Lara players
Association football midfielders
D.C. United players
FC Cincinnati players
Major League Soccer players
2019 Copa América players
2021 Copa América players
21st-century Venezuelan people